Jorge A. Rod (born 1947) is an American politician who represented the 9th Legislative District in the New Jersey General Assembly from 1982 to 1986.

Born in Colombia, Rod attended Hackensack High School. He served in the United States Army for three year from 1965 to 1968 attaining the rank of sergeant. He then attended Ocean County College and Trenton State College (since renamed as The College of New Jersey).

A resident of Lacey Township, New Jersey, Rod served on the Township Council and was selected as mayor in 1981.

During most of his tenure in the General Assembly, he had been a Republican. However, on August 27, 1985, he switched his party registration to Democratic. He had been defeated by Jeffrey Moran and his previous running mate John T. Hendrickson Jr. in the June Republican primary. He joined the Democratic ticket for the seat that November but lost to both Republicans.

References

1947 births
Living people
Hackensack High School alumni
Mayors of places in New Jersey
Republican Party members of the New Jersey General Assembly
Democratic Party members of the New Jersey General Assembly
Ocean County College alumni
People from Lacey Township, New Jersey
Politicians from Ocean County, New Jersey
The College of New Jersey alumni
United States Army non-commissioned officers